West Perry High School is a small, rural public high school located at 2608 Shermans Valley Road, Elliottsburg, Pennsylvania. The school is the only high school operated by the West Perry School District. In 2016, enrollment was reported as 811 pupils in 9th through 12th grades]]. In 2015 enrollment was reported at 800 pupils. In 2014, enrollment was reported as 802 pupils in 9th through 12th grades, with 32.79% of pupils eligible for a free lunch due to family poverty.

West Perry High School students may choose to attend Cumberland Perry Area Vocational Technical School for training in the Construction trades, Mechanical trades, Criminal Justice, Culinary Arts and allied health careers. Additionally, an extensive Agriculture education program in association with FFA, is offered at the high school. For those students who prefer an online learning experience, West Perry High School offers cyber school called West Perry Virtual Academy through a program provided by the Capital Area Online Learning Association. Students can still participate in all extracurriculars offered at West Perry High School.

West Perry High School serves: the boroughs of Blain, New Bloomfield and Landisburg, as well as, Carroll Township, Centre Township, Jackson Township, Northeast Madison Township, Saville Township, Spring Township, Southwest Madison Township, Toboyne Township (part), and Tyrone Township.

Extracurriculars
West Perry High School offers a wide variety of clubs, activities and an extensive sports program.

West Perry's 1989 football team was the last undefeated team in Pennsylvania not to make the state playoffs, a distinction that the school may hold forever since the playoff format has been massively expanded since. Ten years later the football team, led by future University of Georgia and Baltimore Ravens running back Musa Smith, became the first squad in school history to make the post-season. The team faced the Central York Panthers in the first round of the playoffs, winning by a score of 42–0, making the Panthers the eighth team that season the Mustangs had forced the "mercy rule" upon.  In the second game, the district finals, the Mustangs faced the Manheim Central Barons (winners of the 10 previous District 3 AAA championships) and were not so fortunate, losing 28–21 with the game ending as West Perry reached the opponent's 1-yard line.

The West Perry baseball team won consecutive state AA titles in 1979 and 1980. The West Perry boys basketball team reached the state AAA semi-finals in 2006.

The district funds:

Boys
Baseball - AAA
Basketball- AAA
Cross country - AA
Football - AAA
Soccer - AA
Track and field - AAA
Wrestling - AAA

Girls
Basketball - AAA
Cheer - AAAA (added 2014)
Cross country - AA
Field hockey - AA
Soccer - AA
Softball - AAA
Track and field - AAA
Volleyball - AA

According to PIAA directory July 2013

Notable alumni

 Brent Milligan - former MiLB baseball pitcher (St. Louis Cardinals)
 Leon Hoke - former MiLB baseball pitcher (Baltimore Orioles)
 Tim Rice - former MiLB baseball pitcher (Chicago Cubs)
 Josh Bell - former MiLB baseball player (New York Mets)
 B.J. Barnes - former MiLB baseball player (Pittsburgh Pirates)
 Ben Dum - MiLB baseball pitcher (Atlanta Braves)
 Angie Loy - USA Field Hockey (2008 U.S. Olympic Team)
 Musa Smith - former NFL running back (Baltimore Ravens)
 Perry A. Stambaugh - PA State Representative (Jan. 2021 – present); national and statewide magazine editor (Rural Electric Magazine, Penn Lines, Pennsylvania Farmer)
 Mark Keller - PA State Representative (Jan. 2005 – Nov. 2020)
 C. Allan Egolf - PA State Representative (Jan. 1993 - Nov. 2004) (Green Park Union graduate)
 Sue Kullen (Hamman) - MD State Representative (2004-2011)

References

Susquehanna Valley
Education in Harrisburg, Pennsylvania
Education in Perry County, Pennsylvania
Public high schools in Pennsylvania